Sub Pop 1000 is a compilation album released by Sub Pop. The album was  limited, one-time release of 5,000 colored 12-inch vinyl records with cover art by Nathan Fox and will also include a 16-page booklet and MP3 download coupon. The record's release date coincides with Record Store Day on April 20, 2013, but is not a Record Store Day exclusive. The title references the 1986 compilation Sub Pop 100 and features previously unreleased songs by up-and-coming artists on the Sub Pop label.

Track listing

See also
Sub Pop 100
Sub Pop 200

References

External links
Sub Pop 1000 release page on Subpop.com

Sub Pop compilation albums
Alternative rock compilation albums
2013 compilation albums
Record label compilation albums